The ice hockey team rosters at the 1948 Winter Olympics consisted of the following players:

Austria

Canada
Head coach: Frank Boucher

Czechoslovakia
Head coach:  Mike Buckna

Great Britain
Head coach:  Carl Erhardt

Italy
Head coach:  Othmar Delnon

Poland
Head coach: Zbigniew Kasprzak

Sweden
Head coach: Sven Bergqvist

Switzerland
Head coach:  Wyn Cook

United States
Head coach: John Garrison

References

Sources

Hockey Hall Of Fame page on the 1948 Olympics

rosters
1948